Fun! Fun! Minigolf is a minigolf video game developed and published by Shin'en Multimedia for the Wii's WiiWare and Nintendo 3DS' Nintendo eShop digital distribution services. It was first released in North America on December 22, 2008, and later in PAL regions on January 2, 2009 and in Japan on February 17, 2009.

Reception
GameSpot gave Fun! Fun! Minigolf a 7 out of 10, saying "like real minigolf, it is best enjoyed with a group of people who won't take it too seriously". Nintendo Life gave the game 6 out of 10, commenting that "Fun! Fun! Minigolf provides a satisfying first-time play through on the easy difficulty holes, but will frustrate you to no end if you are up to the challenge of figuring out all of the harder 18 holes." IGN gave it 5.8/10, criticizing the short length of the game and fixed gameplay rules that cannot be changed.

Sequel
On 13 December 2011, a sequel to Fun! Fun! Minigolf was revealed by Nintendo for the Nintendo 3DS. It is titled Fun! Fun! Minigolf Touch! and was released on March 8, 2012, in North America and Europe.

References

2008 video games
Nintendo 3DS eShop games
WiiWare games
Miniature golf video games
Video games developed in Germany
Wii games
Multiplayer and single-player video games